Between 1978 and 2006 there were a number of legal disputes between Apple Corps (owned by The Beatles) and the computer manufacturer Apple Computer (now Apple Inc.) over competing trademark rights. The High Court of Justice in England handed down a judgement on 8 May 2006 in favour of Apple Computer. The companies reached a final settlement, as revealed on 5 February 2007.

History of trademark disputes

1978–1981
In 1978, Apple Corps, the Beatles-founded holding company and owner of their record label, Apple Records, filed a lawsuit against Apple Computer for trademark infringement. The suit was settled in 1981 with an undisclosed amount being paid to Apple Corps. This amount was later revealed to be  (equivalent to $ in ). As a condition of the settlement, Apple Computer agreed not to enter the music business, and Apple Corps agreed not to enter the computer business.

1986–1989 
In 1986, Apple Computer added MIDI and audio-recording capabilities to its computers, which included putting the advanced Ensoniq 5503 DOC sound chip from famous synthesizer maker Ensoniq into the Apple IIGS computer. In 1989, this led Apple Corps to sue again, claiming violation of the 1981 settlement agreement. The outcome of this litigation effectively ended all forays at the time by Apple Computer into the multimedia field in parallel with the Amiga, and any future advanced built-in musical hardware in the Macintosh line.

1991
In 1991, another settlement involving payment of around million (equivalent to $million in ) to Apple Corps was reached. This time, an Apple Computer employee named Jim Reekes had included a sampled system sound called Chimes to the Macintosh operating system (the sound was later renamed to sosumi, to be read phonetically as "so sue me"). Outlined in the settlement was each company's respective trademark rights to the term "Apple". Apple Corps held the right to use Apple on any "creative works whose principal content is music", while Apple Computer held the right to use Apple on "goods or services ... used to reproduce, run, play or otherwise deliver such content", but not on content distributed on physical media. In other words, Apple Computer agreed that it would not package, sell or distribute physical music materials.

2003–2006
In September 2003, Apple Corps sued Apple Computer again, this time for breach of contract, in using the Apple logo in the creation and operation of Apple Computer's iTunes Music Store, which Apple Corps contended was a violation of the previous agreement. Some observers believed the wording of the previous settlement favoured Apple Computer in this case. Other observers speculated that if Apple Corps was successful, Apple Computer would be forced to offer a much larger settlement, perhaps resulting in Apple Corps becoming a major shareholder in Apple Computer, or perhaps in Apple Computer splitting the iPod and related business into a separate entity.

The trial opened on 29 March 2006 in England, before a single judge of the High Court. In opening arguments, a lawyer for Apple Corps stated that in 2003, shortly before the launch of Apple Computer's on-line music store, Apple Corps rejected a $1 million offer from Apple Computer to use the Apple name on the iTunes store.

On 8 May 2006 the court ruled in favour of Apple Computer, with Mr Justice Mann holding that "no breach of the trademark agreement [had] been demonstrated".

The Judge focused on section 4.3 of that agreement:

The Judge held Apple Computer's use was covered under this clause.

In response, Neil Aspinall, manager of Apple Corps, indicated that the company did not accept the decision: "With great respect to the trial judge, we consider he has reached the wrong conclusion. [...] We will accordingly be filing an appeal and putting the case again to the Court of Appeal." The judgment orders Apple Corps to pay Apple Computer's legal costs at an estimated GB£2 million, but pending the appeal the judge declined Apple Computer's request for an interim payment of £1.5 million.

The verdict coincidentally led to the Guy Goma incident on BBC News 24, in which a job applicant mistakenly appeared on air after he was confused with computing expert Guy Kewney.

2007 
There was a hint that relations between the companies were improving at the January 2007 Macworld conference, when Apple Inc. CEO Steve Jobs featured Beatles content heavily in his keynote presentation and demonstration of the iPhone. During that year's All Things Digital conference, Jobs quoted the Beatles song "Two of Us" in reference to his relationship with co-panelist Microsoft chairman Bill Gates. Speculation abounded regarding the much anticipated arrival of the Beatles' music to the iTunes Store.

As revealed on 5 February 2007, Apple Inc. and Apple Corps reached a settlement of their trademark dispute under which Apple Inc. will own all of the trademarks related to "Apple" and will license certain of those trademarks back to Apple Corps for their continued use. The settlement ends the ongoing trademark lawsuit between the companies, with each party bearing its own legal costs, and Apple Inc. will continue using its name and logos on iTunes. The settlement includes terms that are confidential, although newspaper accounts at the time stated that Apple Computer was buying out Apple Corps' trademark rights for a total of $500 million.

Commenting on the settlement, Apple Inc. CEO Steve Jobs said, "We love the Beatles, and it has been painful being at odds with them over these trademarks. It feels great to resolve this in a positive manner, and in a way that should remove the potential of further disagreements in the future."

Commenting on the settlement on behalf of the shareholders of Apple Corps, Neil Aspinall, manager of Apple Corps said, "It is great to put this dispute behind us and move on. The years ahead are going to be very exciting times for us. We wish Apple Inc. every success and look forward to many years of peaceful co-operation with them."

Reports in April 2007 that Apple Corps had settled another long-running dispute with EMI (and that Neil Aspinall had retired and been replaced by Jeff Jones) further fueled media speculation that The Beatles' catalogue would appear on iTunes.

In early September 2007, an Apple press release for the new iPod touch, related iPod updates, and iPhone price cut was titled "The Beat Goes On", the title of the Beatles' last press release before splitting up. Although Beatles content was still unavailable from the iTunes store, each Beatle's solo work could be accessed and downloaded on this service. Paul McCartney was quoted in Rolling Stone as saying that their catalogue would be released through digital music stores such as iTunes in the first quarter of 2008, but this did not happen until 2010.

See also
Apple Inc. litigation
A moron in a hurry, a legal test referenced by Apple's lawyers
Confusing similarity, a test in trademark law

References

Bibliography

Apple Corps
Apple Inc. litigation
High Court of Justice cases
2006 in British case law